Rockin' in Rhythm is an album by The Swingville All-Stars nominally led by saxophonists Al Sears and Hilton Jefferson and trumpeter Taft Jordan recorded in 1960 and originally released on the Swingville label.

Track listing
 "Things Ain't What They Used to Be" (Mercer Ellington, Ted Persons) – 6:06
 "Li'l Darling" (Neal Hefti) – 6:36
 "Tenderly" (Walter Gross, Jack Lawrence) – 4:58
 "New Carnegie Blues" (Al Sears) – 5:41
 "Rockin' in Rhythm" (Duke Ellington) – 4:16
 "Willow Weep for Me" (Ann Ronell) – 7:11

Personnel 
Al Sears – tenor saxophone
Taft Jordan – trumpet
Hilton Jefferson – alto saxophone
Don Abney – piano
Wendell Marshall – bass
Gus Johnson – drums

References 

1960 albums
Al Sears albums
Taft Jordan albums
Hilton Jefferson albums
Swingville Records albums
Albums recorded at Van Gelder Studio
Albums produced by Ozzie Cadena